Gabriel Dubois (31 August 1911 – 13 February 1985) was a French racing cyclist. He rode in the 1936 Tour de France.

References

1911 births
1985 deaths
French male cyclists
Place of birth missing